GTE Interactive Media was a video game development company located in Carlsbad, California. Its focus was on the development of videos, of interactive television platforms, and of interactive video game products for arcade machines, home console cartridges, and CD-ROMs, including development and publishing under the GTE Entertainment brand. It folded in 1997.

History
GTE Interactive was founded as GTE ImagiTrek in 1990 by Richard E. Robinson, as a division of GTE Vantage, a wholly owned subsidiary of the now-defunct telecommunications provider GTE. Originally named GTE ImagiTrek, it was renamed GTE Interactive Media in 1994. Richard Scott, vice president of New Ventures at GTE said "At its inception, GTE Interactive Media was viewed as a complementary adjunct to GTE's plans to develop broadband video services networks."

In January 1995, the division entered a partnership with Nintendo for the development of arcade games and of online networking. In the same month, the partnership previewed its first title, FX Fighter, at Consumer Electronics Show in Las Vegas.

In 1995, the division experienced a high of 120 employees. Experiencing difficulties in the video game market and with the Telecommunications Act of 1996 putting a pinch on GTE due to deregulation, the division began to steadily lay off staff. The parent company GTE planned to cease its own content creation in favor of feeding its networks with the rapidly expanding market of third party content.

Failing to find a buyer or partner, the division announced in January 1997 that it would lay off 85 employees and cease operations on March 14, 1997. The remaining "skeleton staff" would provide technical support and further shutdown services through June 30. Citing hardships in the entire CD-ROM market, Dick Nordman, finance director for GTE's New Ventures group in Irving, Texas, explained, "In the beginning, the idea was that we wanted to get into the content business. Now, with everything else going on in the telecommunications industry, we felt our energies would be better spent in the telco arena."

List of games 
This is a list of video games designed in whole or in part by GTE Interactive Media.

References

External links
GTE Vantage Incorporated

Defunct companies based in California
Defunct video game companies of the United States
Video game development companies
Video game publishers
Video game companies established in 1990
Companies based in Carlsbad, California
Verizon Communications
1990 establishments in California
1997 disestablishments in California
Video game companies disestablished in 1997